This is a list of prefects of Virovitica-Podravina County.

Prefects of Virovitica-Podravina County (1993–present)

See also
Virovitica-Podravina County

Notes

External links
World Statesmen - Virovitica-Podravina County

Virovitica-Podravina County